Victor York Richardson  (7 September 189430 October 1969) was a leading Australian sportsman of the 1920s and 1930s, captaining the Australia cricket team and the South Australia Australian rules football team, representing Australia in baseball and South Australia in golf, winning the South Australian state tennis title and also being a leading local player in lacrosse, basketball and swimming.

Richardson won the South Australian National Football League's highest individual honour, the Magarey Medal, while captain-coach of Sturt in 1920.

Early life
Richardson was born in Parkside, South Australia and grew up in the Unley area. He attended Kyre (later Scotch) College. Naturally athletic, he played many sports, including gymnastics, basketball, cricket, baseball, lacrosse, and Australian Rules football. He worked in the South Australian public service.

Cricket career
Richardson is most famous for his contribution to cricket, representing Australia in 19 Test matches between 1924 and 1936, including five as captain in the 1935-36 tour of South Africa.

A talented right-handed batsman and rated the best fielder in the world, Richardson made his first-class debut for South Australia in the 1918–19 season. In a career that lasted twenty years he played 184 matches for Australia and South Australia, scoring 10,724 runs, including 27 centuries and averaging 37.63.  He took 211 catches (at an average of 1.15 catches per match) and even completed four stumpings as a stand-in wicketkeeper.

Richardson was Australian vice-captain for the 1932-33 English tour of Australia, known as the Bodyline series for England's tactics of bowling fast short-pitched deliveries at the batsmen's bodies. During the Adelaide Test, English manager Pelham Warner came to the Australian dressing seeking an apology from the player who called Harold Larwood a bastard. Richardson, who had answered the knock on the dressing room door turned to his teammates and asked "Which one of you bastards called Larwood a bastard instead of that bastard [Douglas] Jardine?"

Richardson played his final Test against South Africa at Durban on 28 February 1936, aged 41 years 178 days. Only ten Australians have played Test cricket at an older age. He took five catches in the second innings, setting a Test record that has never been beaten and was not equalled until Yajurvindra Singh took five in 1976–77.

Following his retirement from cricket, Richardson was appointed South Australian coach in September 1949, replacing Arthur Richardson (no relation).

To honour his memory and the impact he made for his state, the South Australian Cricket Association dedicated the "Victor Richardson Gates" at the Adelaide Oval and the road leading to them in his honour.

Australian rules football career
Richardson made his senior Australian rules football debut for Sturt Football Club in the South Australian National Football League in 1915 and in a career interrupted by World War I, played 114 games for Sturt, kicking 23 goals.

 114 games and 23 goals for Sturt 1915, 1919–1920, 1922–1924, 1926–1927
 Captain of Sturt 1920, 1922–1924
 Member of premiership teams for Sturt 1915, 1919 and 1926
 10 games for South Australia
 State Captain 1923
 Magarey Medal 1920
 Best and Fairest for Sturt 1922, 1923
 Coach of Sturt 1920, 1922, 1923, 1924

Other sports
Richardson was a gifted sportsman and excelled in other sports besides cricket and Australian rules football, including baseball (national and state representative), golf (state representative), tennis (state title winner), lacrosse, basketball and swimming.

Media career
After retiring from first-class cricket he went on to become a respected radio commentator, forging a partnership with renowned former English Test captain Arthur Gilligan.

Political aspirations
In March 1949 Richardson announced that he would seek Liberal and Country League (LCL) pre-selection for the new federal Division of Kingston, situated in Adelaide's south. At the time Richardson lived on Richmond Road, Westbourne Park, which was located in the electorate.

Family
On 29 January 1919 Victor Richardson married Vida Yvonne Knapman, daughter of hotelier Alf Knapman (1867–1918). She died on 25 September 1940; they had one son and three daughters.

He was a grandfather to three future Australian Test cricketers Ian Chappell, Greg Chappell (who both also captained Australia at Test level) and Trevor Chappell.

Awards and honours
Richardson was appointed an Officer of the Order of the British Empire (OBE) on 10 June 1954 for his services to cricket, including his presidency of the Country Carnival Cricket Association.

Sources

References

External links

 HowSTAT! statistical profile of Vic Richardson
 SANFL Hall of Fame

1894 births
1969 deaths
Australia Test cricket captains
Australian lacrosse players
Australian baseball players
Australia Test cricketers
Australian cricket commentators
Officers of the Order of the British Empire
Magarey Medal winners
South Australia cricketers
Sturt Football Club players
Sturt Football Club coaches
Australian rules footballers from Adelaide
Chappell family
Australian cricketers
South Australian Football Hall of Fame inductees
Cricketers from Adelaide
Sport Australia Hall of Fame inductees
Sportsmen from South Australia